This is a list of the squads picked for the 2012 ICC Under-19 Cricket World Cup. Players with international caps are listed in bold.

Group A

Coach:  Stuart Law

Coach:  Tim Boon

Coach:  Ryan Eagleson

Coach:  Pubudu Dassanayake

Group B

Coach:  Geoff Lawson

Coach:  Sabih Azhar

Coach:  Matt Horne

Coach:  Craig Wright

Group C

Coach:  Bharat Arun

Coach:  John Ovia

Coach:  Roddy Estwick

Coach:  Chris Harris

Group D

Coach:  Zafrul Ehsan

Coach:  Doug Watson

Coach:   Ray Jennings

Coach:  Romesh Kaluwitharana

References and notes

ICC Under-19 Cricket World Cup squads
2012 in cricket
2012 ICC Under-19 Cricket World Cup